Telecommunications in Antarctica is provided by the organization that have established research stations on the continent. Antarctica is not formally designated by the International Telecommunication Union (ITU) in any of the world zones.

Communication infrastructure is provided through service providers in each country that administers each base.

Telephone communication

United States bases
 Telephones – main lines in use: 0 (note: information for US bases only, 2001)
 Telephones – mobile cellular: Argentine bases have GSM networks provided by Argentinean carriers Claro and Movistar; Iridium system in use
 Telephone system
 general assessment: local systems at some research stations
 domestic: N/A
 international: via satellite from some research stations

Australian and New Zealand stations
Five locations (Casey Station (AU), Davis Station (AU), Macquarie Island Station (AU), Mawson Station (AU) and Scott Base (NZ)) all have telephone connections that enable direct dialling to and from the outside world. Connections to the Australian stations is via the country calling code +672.

Argentinian and Chilean bases within their claims, which have families living at them, are also connected by direct dial connections.

Connection to Scott Base and the nearby United States base McMurdo Station is via the New Zealand country calling code +64 (see Telecommunications in New Zealand).

Television
Television broadcast stations
 American Forces Antarctic Network at McMurdo Station, US; cable system with six channels (note: information for US bases only, 2002)
Television channels
 several hundred at McMurdo Station, US (note: information for US bases only, 2001)

Internet
Internet Service Providers (ISPs): Argentine bases have  on polar plateau which was installed in 2009.

Country code (Top level domain): .aq

Data access to the Amundsen–Scott South Pole Station is provided by access via NASA's TDRS-F1, GOES & Iridium satellite constellation.  Marisat F-2 provided data communications until it was retired in 2008. For the 2007-2008 season, the TDRS relay (named South Pole TDRSS Relay or SPTR) was upgraded to support a data return rate of 50 Mbit/s, which comprises over 90% of the South Pole's data capability, which is used primarily for scientific data return.

The Australian Stations each have a satellite data connection, currently contracted to Speedcast. This provides each station with a 9Mbps symmetric connection.  

Data and telephony access to Scott Base - New Zealand is provided via C-Band by Spark NZ & Horizons 3E.

Regarding Argentine bases in general, Marambio Base has wireless internet and two mobile phone servers.

Orbcomm satellites which pass over Antarctica can relay short messages to and from transceiver units to email or XML over HTTP.

The McMurdo station has permanent access to a shared 17Mbit/s connection; testing of the Starlink service begun in September 2022, with a second terminal providing connectivity for the Allan Hills field camp brought in November 2022.

Radio

Official broadcasts
 Argentina Bases: Radio Nacional Arcangel San Gabriel, Esperanza Base, on 15476 kHz with 2 kW and 97.6 MHz. QSL cards verified.
 Chile Bases: Radio Soberania, Villa las Estrellas on 90.5 MHz with 100 W.
 United States Bases: American Forces Antarctic Network AFAN McMurdo, on 93.9 MHz with 30 W and 104.5 MHz with 50 W.
 Scott Base - New Zealand: Scott97FM, On 97.0 MHz with 25 W

Amateur radio
Several bases used their transceivers also to provide amateur radio worldwide communications on HF or amateur radio satellites with specific club callsigns, also useful on utility and emergency communications.

List of research facilities and country codes

Notes

References

External links

 https://www.usap.gov/technology/